Musicology (from Greek μουσική mousikē 'music' and -λογια -logia, 'domain of study') is the scholarly analysis and research-based study of music. Musicology departments traditionally belong to the humanities, although some music research is scientific in focus (psychological, sociological, acoustical, neurological, computational). Some geographers and anthropologists have an interest in musicology so the social sciences also have an academic interest. A scholar who participates in musical research is a musicologist.

Musicology traditionally is divided in three main branches: historical musicology, systematic musicology and ethnomusicology. Historical musicologists mostly study the history of the western classical music tradition, the origin of the works composed, the lifes of the composers and how they relate to the music studied. However, the study of music history need not be limited to that. Ethnomusicologists draw from anthropology (particularly field research) to understand how and why people make music. Systematic musicology includes music theory, aesthetics, pedagogy, musical acoustics, the science and technology of musical instruments, and the musical implications of physiology, psychology, sociology, philosophy and computing. Cognitive musicology is the set of phenomena surrounding the cognitive modeling of music. When musicologists carry out research using computers, their research often falls under the field of computational musicology. Music therapy is a specialized form of applied musicology which is sometimes considered more closely affiliated with health fields, and other times regarded as part of musicology proper.

Background
The 19th century philosophical trends that led to the re-establishment of formal musicology education in German and Austrian universities had combined methods of systematization with evolution. These models were established not only in the field of physical anthropology, but also cultural anthropology. This was influenced by Hegel's ideas on ordering "phenomena" from the simple to complex as the stages of evolution are classified from primitive to developed, and stages of history from ancient to modern. Comparative methods became more widespread in diverse disciplines from anatomy to Indo-European linguistics, and beginning around 1880, also in comparative musicology.

Parent disciplines
The parent disciplines of musicology include:
 General history
 Cultural studies
 Philosophy (particularly aesthetics and semiotics)
 Ethnology and cultural anthropology
 Archaeology and prehistory
 Psychology and sociology
 Physiology and neuroscience
 Acoustics and psychoacoustics
 Computer/information sciences and mathematics

Musicology also has two central, practically oriented sub-disciplines with no parent discipline: performance practice and research (sometimes viewed as a form of artistic research), and the theory, analysis and composition of music. The disciplinary neighbours of musicology address other forms of art, performance, ritual and communication, including the history and theory of the visual and plastic arts and architecture; linguistics, literature and theatre; religion and theology; and sport. Musical knowledge is applied in medicine, education and music therapy—which, effectively, are parent disciplines of applied musicology.

Subdisciplines

Historical musicology
Music history or historical musicology is concerned with the composition, performance, reception and criticism of music over time. Historical studies of music are for example concerned with a composer's life and works, the developments of styles and genres (such as baroque concertos), the social function of music for a particular group of people, (such as court music), or modes of performance at a particular place and time (such as Johann Sebastian Bach's choir in Leipzig). Like the comparable field of art history, different branches and schools of historical musicology emphasize different types of musical works and approaches to music. There are also national differences in various definitions of historical musicology. In theory, "music history" could refer to the study of the history of any type or genre of music (such as the history of Indian music or the history of rock). In practice, these research topics are more often considered within ethnomusicology (see below) and "historical musicology" is typically assumed to imply Western Art music of the European tradition.

The methods of historical musicology include source studies (especially manuscript studies), palaeography, philology (especially textual criticism), style criticism, historiography (the choice of historical method), musical analysis (analysis of music to find "inner coherence") and iconography. The application of musical analysis to further these goals is often a part of music history, though pure analysis or the development of new tools of music analysis is more likely to be seen in the field of music theory. Music historians create a number of written products, ranging from journal articles describing their current research, new editions of musical works, biographies of composers and other musicians, book-length studies or university textbook chapters or entire textbooks. Music historians may examine issues in a close focus, as in the case of scholars who examine the relationship between words and music for a given composer's art songs. On the other hand, some scholars take a broader view and assess the place of a given type of music, such as the symphony in society using techniques drawn from other fields, such as economics, sociology or philosophy.

New musicology
New musicology is a term applied since the late 1980s to a wide body of work emphasizing cultural study, analysis and criticism of music. Such work may be based on feminist, gender studies, queer theory or postcolonial theory, or the work of Theodor W. Adorno. Although New Musicology emerged from within historical musicology, the emphasis on cultural study within the Western art music tradition places New Musicology at the junction between historical, ethnological and sociological research in music.

New musicology was a reaction against traditional historical musicology, which according to Susan McClary, "fastidiously declares issues of musical signification off-limits to those engaged in legitimate scholarship." Charles Rosen, however, retorts that McClary, "sets up, like so many of the 'new musicologists', a straw man to knock down, the dogma that music has no meaning, and no political or social significance." Today, many musicologists no longer distinguish between musicology and new musicology since it has been recognized that many of the scholarly concerns once associated with new musicology already were mainstream in musicology, so that the term "new" no longer applies.

Ethnomusicology
Ethnomusicology, formerly comparative musicology, is the study of music in its cultural context. It is often considered the anthropology or ethnography of music. Jeff Todd Titon has called it the study of "people making music". Although it is most often concerned with the study of non-Western music, it also includes the study of Western music from an anthropological or sociological perspective, cultural studies and sociology as well as other disciplines in the social sciences and humanities. Some ethnomusicologists primarily conduct historical studies, but the majority are involved in long-term participant observation or combine ethnographic, musicological, and historical approaches in their fieldwork. Therefore, ethnomusicological scholarship can be characterized as featuring a substantial, intensive fieldwork component, often involving long-term residence within the community studied. Closely related to ethnomusicology is the emerging branch of sociomusicology. For instance, Ko (2011) proposed the hypothesis of "Biliterate and Trimusical" in Hong Kong sociomusicology.

Popular music studies

Popular music studies, known, "misleadingly", as popular musicology, emerged in the 1980s as an increasing number of musicologists, ethnomusicologists and other varieties of historians of American and European culture began to write about popular music past and present. The first journal focusing on popular music studies was Popular Music which began publication in 1981. The same year an academic society solely devoted to the topic was formed, the International Association for the Study of Popular Music. The association's founding was partly motivated by the interdisciplinary agenda of popular musicology though the group has been characterized by a polarized 'musicological' and 'sociological' approach also typical of popular musicology.

Music theory, analysis and composition
Music theory is a field of study that describes the elements of music and includes the development and application of methods for composing and for analyzing music through both notation and, on occasion, musical sound itself. Broadly, theory may include any statement, belief or conception of or about music (Boretz, 1995). A person who studies or practices music theory is a music theorist.

Some music theorists attempt to explain the techniques composers use by establishing rules and patterns. Others model the experience of listening to or performing music. Though extremely diverse in their interests and commitments, many Western music theorists are united in their belief that the acts of composing, performing and listening to music may be explicated to a high degree of detail (this, as opposed to a conception of musical expression as fundamentally ineffable except in musical sounds). Generally, works of music theory are both descriptive and prescriptive, attempting both to define practice and to influence later practice.

Musicians study music theory to understand the structural relationships in the (nearly always notated) music. Composers study music theory to understand how to produce effects and structure their own works. Composers may study music theory to guide their precompositional and compositional decisions. Broadly speaking, music theory in the Western tradition focuses on harmony and counterpoint, and then uses these to explain large scale structure and the creation of melody.

Music psychology
Music psychology applies the content and methods of all subdisciplines of psychology (perception, cognition, motivation, etc.) to understand how music is created, perceived, responded to, and incorporated into individuals' and societies' daily lives. Its primary branches include cognitive musicology, which emphasizes the use of computational models for human musical abilities and cognition, and the cognitive neuroscience of music, which studies the way that music perception and production manifests in the brain using the methodologies of cognitive neuroscience. While aspects of the field can be highly theoretical, much of modern music psychology seeks to optimize the practices and professions of music performance, composition, education and therapy.

Performance practice and research
Performance practice draws on many of the tools of historical musicology to answer the specific question of how music was performed in various places at various times in the past. Although previously confined to early music, recent research in performance practice has embraced questions such as how the early history of recording affected the use of vibrato in classical music or instruments in Klezmer.

Within the rubric of musicology, performance practice tends to emphasize the collection and synthesis of evidence about how music should be performed. The important other side, learning how to sing authentically or perform a historical instrument is usually part of conservatory or other performance training. However, many top researchers in performance practice are also excellent musicians.

Music performance research (or music performance science) is strongly associated with music psychology. It aims to document and explain the psychological, physiological, sociological and cultural details of how music is actually performed (rather than how it should be performed). The approach to research tends to be systematic and empirical and to involve the collection and analysis of both quantitative and qualitative data. The findings of music performance research can often be applied in music education.

Education and careers

Musicologists in tenure track professor positions typically hold a PhD in musicology. In the 1960s and 1970s, some musicologists obtained professor positions with an MA as their highest degree, but in the 2010s, the PhD is the standard minimum credential for tenure track professor positions. As part of their initial training, musicologists typically complete a BMus or a BA in music (or a related field such as history) and in many cases an MA in musicology. Some individuals apply directly from a bachelor's degree to a PhD, and in these cases, they may not receive an MA. In the 2010s, given the increasingly interdisciplinary nature of university graduate programs, some applicants for musicology PhD programs may have academic training both in music and outside of music (e.g., a student may apply with a BMus and an MA in psychology). In music education, individuals may hold an M.Ed and an Ed.D.

Most musicologists work as instructors, lecturers or professors in colleges, universities or conservatories. The job market for tenure track professor positions is very competitive. Entry-level applicants must hold a completed PhD or the equivalent degree and applicants to more senior professor positions must have a strong record of publishing in peer-reviewed journals. Some PhD-holding musicologists are only able to find insecure positions as sessional lecturers. The job tasks of a musicologist are the same as those of a professor in any other humanities discipline: teaching undergraduate and/or graduate classes in their area of specialization and, in many cases some general courses (such as Music Appreciation or Introduction to Music History); conducting research in their area of expertise, publishing articles about their research in peer-reviewed journals, authors book chapters, books or textbooks; traveling to conferences to give talks on their research and learn about research in their field; and, if their program includes a graduate school, supervising MA and PhD students, giving them guidance on the preparation of their theses and dissertations. Some musicology professors may take on senior administrative positions in their institution, such as Dean or Chair of the School of Music.

Notable journals
 19th-Century Music (1977–present)
 Acta Musicologica (1928–2014) (International Musicological Society)
 Asian Music (1968–2002)
 BACH: Journal of the Riemenschneider Bach Institute (1970–present)
 Black Music Research Journal (1980–2004)
 Early Music History (1981–2002)
 Ethnomusicology (1953–2003) (Society for Ethnomusicology)
 Journal of Music Theory (1957–2002)
 The Journal of Musicology (1982–2004)
 Journal of the American Musicological Society (1948–present) (American Musicological Society)
 Journal of the Society for American Music
 Musica Disciplina (1946–present)
 Music Educators Journal (1934–2007)
 Music Theory Spectrum (1979–present) (Society for Music Theory)
 The Musical Quarterly (1915–present)
 Perspectives of New Music (1962–present)
 The World of Music (1957−present)
 Yearbook for Traditional Music (1981–2003)

Role of women

The vast majority of major musicologists and music historians from past generations have been men, as in the 19th century and early 20th century; women's involvement in teaching music was mainly in elementary and secondary music teaching. Nevertheless, some women musicologists have reached the top ranks of the profession. Carolyn Abbate (born 1956) is an American musicologist who did her PhD at Princeton University. She has been described by the Harvard Gazette as "one of the world's most accomplished and admired music historians".

Susan McClary (born 1946) is a musicologist associated with new musicology who incorporates feminist music criticism in her work. McClary holds a PhD from Harvard University. One of her best known works is Feminine Endings (1991), which covers musical constructions of gender and sexuality, gendered aspects of traditional music theory, gendered sexuality in musical narrative, music as a gendered discourse and issues affecting women musicians.

Other notable women scholars include:

Eva Badura-Skoda
Margaret Bent
Suzanne Cusick
Ursula Günther
Maud Cuney Hare
Amelia Ishmael
Tammy L. Kernodle
Liudmila Kovnatskaya
Elizabeth Eva Leach
Ottalie Mark
Carol J. Oja
Rosetta Reitz
Elaine Sisman
Hedi Stadlen
Rose Rosengard Subotnik
Anahit Tsitsikian
Sherrie Tucker

See also

Acoustics
Aesthetics of music
Choreomusicology
Computational musicology
List of musicologists
List of musicology topics
Music and emotion
Music and mathematics
Music education
Musical analysis
Musical temperament
Musical tuning
Organology
Prehistoric music
Psychoanalysis and music
Scale (music)
Set theory (music)
Sociomusicology
Tonality
World music
Virtual Library of Musicology

References

Further reading

Allen, Warren Dwight (1962). Philosophies of Music History: a Study of General Histories of Music, 1600–1960. New ... ed. New York: Dover Publications. N.B.: First published in 1939; expanded and updated for republication in 1962.
 Babich, Babette (2003) "Postmodern Musicology" in Victor E. Taylor and Charles Winquist, eds., Routledge Encyclopedia of Postmodernism, London: Routledge, 2003. pp. 153–159. .
Brackett, David (1995). Interpreting Popular Music. .
Cook, Nicholas, "What is Musicology?", BBC Music Magazine 7 (May, 1999), 31–33
Everett, Walter, ed. (2000). Expression in Pop-Rock Music. .
McCollum, Jonathan and David Hebert, eds. (2014). Theory and Method in Historical Ethnomusicology. Lanham, Maryland: Lexington. .
 Honing, Henkjan (2006). "On the growing role of observation, formalization and experimental method in musicology. " Empirical Musicology Review.
 Kerman, Joseph (1985). Musicology. London: Fontana. .
 McClary, Susan, and Robert Walser (1988). "Start Making Sense! Musicology Wrestles with Rock" in On Record ed. by Frith and Goodwin (1990), pp. 277–292..
 McClary, Susan (2000). "Women and Music on the Verge of the New Millennium (Special Issue: Feminists at a Millennium)", Signs 25/4 (Summer): 1283–1286.
Middleton, Richard (1990/2002). Studying Popular Music. Philadelphia: Open University Press. .
Moore, A. F. (2001). Rock: The Primary Text, 2nd ed., .
 Parncutt, Richard. (2007). "Systematic musicology and the history and future of Western musical scholarship", Journal of Interdisciplinary Music Studies, 1, 1–32.
 Pruett, James W., and Thomas P. Slavens (1985). Research Guide to Musicology. Chicago: American Library Association. .
 Randel, Don Michael, ed. (4th ed. 2003). Harvard Dictionary of Music, pp. 452–454. The Belknap Press of Harvard University Press. .
 Sorce Keller, Marcello. "The Emperor's New Clothes: Why Musicologies Do Not Always Wish to Know All They Could Know", in Victoria Lindsay Levine and Philip V. Bohlman. This Thing Called Music. Essays in Honor of Bruno Nettl. Lanham-Boulder-New York-London: Rowman & Littlefield, 2015, pp. 366–377.
 Tagg, Philip (1979, ed. 2000). Kojak – 50 Seconds of Television Music: Toward the Analysis of Affect in Popular Music, pp. 38–45. The Mass Media Music Scholar's Press. .
Tagg, Philip (1982). "Analysing Popular Music: Theory, Method and Practice", Popular Music, vol. 2, Theory and Method, pp. 37–67.
van der Merwe, Peter (1989). Origins of the Popular Style: The Antecedents of Twentieth Century Popular Music.  (1992).
Winkler, Peter (1978).

External links

 International Musicological Society (IMS)
 The American Musicological Society
 AMS: Web sites of interest to Musicologists 
 The Society for American Music
 International Association for the Study of Popular Music
 Society for Ethnomusicology
 Society for Music Theory
 The European Network for Theory & Analysis of Music

On-line journals
Many musicology journals are only available in print or through pay-for-access portals. This list, however, contains a sample of peer reviewed and open-access journals in various subfields as examples of musicological writings:
 JIMS: Journal of Interdisciplinary Music Studies
 Echo: a music centered journal
 Empirical Musicology Review (website)
 Ethnomusicology Review
 Journal of Interdisciplinary Music Studies
 JMM: The Journal of Music and Meaning
 Music Theory Online
 Journal of Seventeenth-Century Music
 Min-Ad: Israel Studies in Musicology Online
 Music and Politics
 Volume!, French journal of popular music studies
A list of open-access European journals in the domains of music theory and/or analysis is available on the website of the European Network for Theory & Analysis of Music. A more complete list of open-access journals in theory and analysis can be found on the website of the Société Belge d'Analyse Musicale (in French).

 
Music history
Philosophy of music
Humanities occupations
Occupations in music